Eisenhower Memorial Wayside Park is a  park in Carroll, New Hampshire, along Route 302. There are views of the Presidential Range in the White Mountain National Forest. Picnic tables are available.

The park was established in 1979 as a gift from the Bretton Woods Corporation and honors U.S. President Dwight D. Eisenhower.

References

External links
Eisenhower Memorial Wayside New Hampshire Department of Natural and Cultural Resources

State parks of New Hampshire
Parks in Coös County, New Hampshire
Carroll, New Hampshire
Protected areas established in 1979
1979 establishments in New Hampshire